The Russian Junior Artistic Gymnastics Championships are organized annually by the Russian Artistic Gymnastics Federation.

Competitors are divided into the following categories by gender and age: junior males (14–17 years old), junior females (13–15), boys (11–13) and girls (9–12). Individual events are further divided by skill levels / difficulties. (Each skill level corresponds to a certain sports degree: Master of Sports [MS] and Candidate for Master of Sports [CMS] for juniors, First Class and Second Class for boys/girls.)

Competitions in different gender and/or age groups may be held at different sites and at different time. (For example, competitions in the older age groups can be held simultaneously with the senior nationals. That was the case in 2010, 2012, 2014 and 2016. In 2018, the competitions in the older age groups were held simultaneously with the Cup of Russia. The lower age groups can be conducted as separate championships.)

All-around medalists

Males

Juniors, MS 
As of 2019, the competitors are 16–17 years old.

Juniors, CMS 
As of 2019, the competitors are 14–15 years old.

Boys, First Class 
As of 2019, the competitors are 12–13 years old.

Females

Juniors, MS 
As of 2019, the competitors are 14–15 years old.

Juniors, CMS 
As of 2019, the competitors are 13 years old.

Girls, First Class 
As of 2019, the competitors are 11–12 years old.

Girls, Second Class 
As of 2019, the competitors are 9–10 years old.

References

External links 
 Competitions section on the Russian Artistic Gymnastics Federation website (in Russian)

Gymnastics competitions in Russia
Artistic gymnastics competitions
Youth sport in Russia
Russian Artistic Gymnastics Championships
Recurring sporting events
National championships in Russia